The system of administrative division of Ukraine in 1918 was inherited from the Russian Empire, and was based on the gubernia (also called province, government, or governorate) with smaller subdivisions district (povit) and rural district (volost). New administrative reform was adopted by the Central Council of Ukraine on March 6, 1918 which saw restructuring the subdivision of Ukraine based on a new system of regions (zemlia, plural zemli) and abolishing system of gubernias and povits. Implementation of the new system was never fully realized and after the Skoropadsky's coup-d'etat on April 29, 1918 was abandoned.

Regions

Ukraine was divided into 32 regions with three cities that had status of a region (Kiev, Kharkiv and Odessa).

List of regions
Kiev with outskirts, to Irpin and Stuhna as well as 20 verst beyond Dnieper
Derevlian Region (seat in Korosten), Radomyshl and Ovruch counties, Kiev county without southern part and northern part of Rovno county
Volyn (seat in Lutsk), Volodymyr, Lutsk, Kovel counties and parts of Dubno county
Over Horyn (seat in Rivne), Rivne, Ostroh, Zaslav, Kremenets counties, southern part of Dubno county and western part of Starokostyantyniv county
Bolokhiv Region (seat in Zhytomyr), Zhytomyr, Novohrad-Volynsky counties and parts of Berdychiv, Lityn, and Vinnytsia counties
Over Ros (seat in Bila Tserkva), Vasylkiv, Skvyra, Tarashcha counties, southern part of Kiev county and eastern part of Berdychiv county
Cherkasy Region (seat in Cherkasy), Cherkasy, Kaniv, Chyhyryn counties and parts of Zvenyhorod county
Over Boh (seat in Uman), Uman, Haisyn, and parts of Lypovets, Balta, Yelyzavetghrad counties
Podillia (seat in Kamianets-Podilsky), Kamianets, Proskuriv, Ushytsia counties and parts of Mohyliv and Starokostyantyniv counties
Bratslav Region (seat in Vinnytsia), Vinnytsia, Bratslav counties and parts of Lityn, Lypovets, Mohyliv, and Yampil counties
Over Dniester (seat in Balta), Olhopil, Tyraspil counties and parts of Yampil, Balta, and Ananyiv counties
Over Sea (seat in Mykolaiv), Odessa county and parts of Ananyiv, Yelyzavetghrad, and Kherson counties
Odessa with outskirts, with territory up to the Dniester Estuary
Nyz (seat in Yelyzavetghrad), parts of Yelyzavetghrad, Oleksandriya, Verkhnyodniprovsk counties
Sich (seat in Katerynoslav), Katerynoslav county, and parts of Verhnyodniprovsk, Kherson, Novomoskovsk, and Oleksandriya counties
Zaporizhia (seat in Berdyansk), Melitopol and Berdyansk counties
New Zaporizhia (seat in Kherson), Dnipro county and parts of Kherson county
Azov Region (seat in Mariupol), Mariupol, Pavlohrad counties and parts of Oleksandrivsk county
Cuman Region (seat in Bakhmut), Starobilsk, Slovianoserbsk, and Bakhmut counties
Donets Region (seat in Sloviansk), Zmiiv, Izyum, Vovchansk, Kupyansk counties and parts of Korocha and Bilhorod counties
Over Don (seat in Ostrogozhsk), Novy Oskil, Biryuchansk, Ostrohozk, Bohuchar counties and parts of Korocha and Starobilsk counties
Siveria Region (seat in Starodub), Mhlyn, Surazh, Novozybkiv, Starodub and Novhorod-Siversky counties
Chernihiv Region (seat in Chernihiv), Chernihiv, Horodnya, Oster, Sosnytsia counties and parts of Kozelets, Nizhyn, and Borzna counties
Pereyaslav Region (seat in Pryluky), Pereyaslav, Pryluky, Pyryatyn counties, and parts of Kozelets, Nizhyn, Borzna, and Zolotonosha counties
Over Seim (seat in Konotop), Krolevets, Konotop, Hlukhiv, and Putyvl counties
Over Sula (seat in Romny), Romny, Lokhvytsia, Hadiach counties, and parts of Lubny and Myrhorod counties
Poltava Region (seat in Poltava), Poltava, Zinkiv, Kostyantyniv counties, and parts of Myrhorod, Khorol, Valky, Okhtyrka, and Bohodukhiv counties
Samara Region (seat in Kremenchuk), Kremenchuk, Kobelyaky counties, and parts of Zolotonosha, Khorol, Novomoskovsk counties
Sloboda Region (seat in Sumy), Sumy, Lebedyn, Sudzha, Hraivoron counties, and parts of Okhtyrka and Bohodukhiv counties
Kharkiv with its county and parts of Valky and Bilhorod counties
Podlasie Region (seat in Brest), territory of the former Kholm Governorate
Dregovich Region (seat in Mozyr), territory of Polissya Okruha

See also
 Development of the administrative divisions of Ukraine
 Administrative divisions of Ukraine (1918–1925)
 Administrative divisions of Ukraine (1925–1932)

References

External links
 Shemshuchenko, Yu. Administrative-territorial division in the UNR. Jurist Encyclopedia.

Ukrainian People's Republic